Alexander Achten (born Alexander Weber; 4 January 1978) is a German-born Argentine fencer. He won a bronze medal in the team sabre event at the 2000 Summer Olympics.

See also
List of Pennsylvania State University Olympians

References

External links
 

1978 births
Living people
German male fencers
Olympic fencers of Germany
Fencers at the 2000 Summer Olympics
Olympic bronze medalists for Germany
Olympic medalists in fencing
Sportspeople from Bielefeld
Medalists at the 2000 Summer Olympics
Pan American Games medalists in fencing
German emigrants to Argentina
Argentine male fencers
Fencers at the 2007 Pan American Games
Medalists at the 2007 Pan American Games
Pan American Games bronze medalists for Argentina
South American Games medalists in fencing